Villamil is a surname. Notable people with the surname include: 

 Federico Cantero Villamil (1874–1946), Spanish civil engineer
 Jorge Villamil Cordovez  (1929–2010), Colombian composer and songwriter 
 José de Villamil (1789–1866), leader of Ecuador and first governor of the Galápagos Islands
 Martin de Villamil (1783–1843), Ecuadorian trader, brother of José
 Richard de Villamil (1850–1936), British scientist, grandson of Martin
 Silvia Rodríguez Villamil (1939–2003), Uruguayan historian, feminist, writer, and activist
 Soledad Villamil, Argentine actress

Villaamil
 Fernando Villaamil (1845–1898), Spanish naval officer
 Jenaro Pérez Villaamil (1807–1854), Spanish painter
 Polo Villaamil (born 1979), Spanish racing driver